Oskar Robertsson (born October 2, 1982) is a Swedish Bandy player who currently plays for Västerås SK as a half back.  Oskar was a youth product of Ljusdals BK. 
Oskar has played for four clubs, they are:-
 Ljusdals BK (2000-2003
 Bollnäs GIF (2003-2004)
 Falu BS (2004-2005)
 Västerås SK (2005-)

External links
  oskar robertsson at bandysidan
  västerås sk

Swedish bandy players
Swedish bandy managers
Living people
1982 births
Ljusdals BK players
Bollnäs GIF players
Falu BS players
Västerås SK Bandy players